Diego Requeséns (died 1650) was a Roman Catholic prelate who served as Archbishop (Personal Title) of Mazara del Vallo (1647–1650) and Titular Archbishop of Cartagine (1637–1647).

Biography
On 7 September 1637, Diego Requeséns was appointed during the papacy of Pope Urban VIII as Titular Archbishop of Cartagine.
On 25 October 1637, he was consecrated bishop by Bernardino Spada, Cardinal-Priest of Santo Stefano al Monte Celio, with Ottavio Corsini, Titular Archbishop of Tarsus, and Biago Proto de Rubeis, Archbishop of Messina, serving as co-consecrators. 
On 7 October 1647, he was appointed during the papacy of Pope Innocent X as Archbishop (Personal Title) of Mazara del Vallo.
He served as Archbishop of Mazara del Vallo until his death in March 1650.

Episcopal succession
While bishop, he was the principal co-consecrator of:
Jerónimo Domín Funes, Bishop of Gaeta (1637); 
Pietro Corsetto, Bishop of Cefalù (1638); and
Roberto Strozzi, Bishop of Colle di Val d'Elsa (1638).

References

External links and additional sources
 (for Chronology of Bishops) 
 (for Chronology of Bishops) 

17th-century Roman Catholic titular archbishops
Bishops appointed by Pope Urban VIII
Bishops appointed by Pope Innocent X
1650 deaths
17th-century Roman Catholic bishops in Sicily